Gexin may refer to:

 Chen Gexin (陳歌辛; 1914–1961), Chinese pop music artist of Indian descent
 Gexin Avenue Subdistrict (革新街街道), Yuhua District, Shijiazhuang, China
 Gexin Subdistrict, Harbin (革新街道), in Nangang District, Harbin, China